Amir Abad is a district in the city of Tehran, Iran.

The main street of Amir Abad is called Kargar Avenue and is one of the longest streets of Tehran, extending from Southern Tehran's Rah Ahan Square to Northern Amir Abad.

The Atomic Energy Organization of Iran is headquartered north of this district. University of Tehran has large parts of its engineering, economics, physics departments, and physical education facilities, as well as the majority of its student dormitories located here.

Laleh Park is in the middle of North Kargar street. Shariati Hospital is also located on this street.

Neighbourhoods in Tehran